Anders Petters stuga or Anders Perssons stuga står i ljusan låga is an old Swedish Christmas song of unknown origin. It is often sung when dancing around the Christmas tree. Lyrically, the song deals with a fire in "Anders Petters's" cottage. While the lyrics don't mention Christmas, the word ljusen ("lights, candles") is here strongly associated with the candles lit at Christmastime.

Publication
Julens önskesångbok, 1997, under the lines "Tjugondag Knut dansar julen ut", credited as "folksong"

Recordings
An early recording was done by Margareta Schönström in May 1925, and the record came out in 1926.

References

Swedish-language songs
Swedish Christmas songs
Year of song unknown
Singing games
Songwriter unknown